Runway Cop (literally "Detective Cha") is a 2012 South Korean action comedy film, starring Kang Ji-hwan and Sung Yu-ri and directed by Shin Tae-ra. It tells the story of an overzealous and overweight detective Cha Cheol-soo who goes undercover as a fashion model in order to solve a case. It reunites the two leads since the television series Hong Gil-dong (2008), and is the second film Kang has worked on with Shin since My Girlfriend Is an Agent (2009).

Plot
Cha Chul-soo is an overzealous and overweight detective who stops at nothing to catch his suspect. He doesn't a waste any precious moment to shower, and dresses in ramshackle and sometimes dirty clothes. However, when another cop was injured and unable to go undercover in the city's biggest criminal cases, he steps up to the plate and accepts the challenge to be transformed into a runway model in 60 days. Among the challenges of losing 20 kilograms in 2 weeks, Cha also have to work with high school alum Ko Young-jae, who is the designer. Convinced he stinks and will ruin her show, she sets him the impossible. With so much to learn in such a short period of time, Cha case turns into the biggest radical makeover at the hands of fashion designer.

Cast
Kang Ji-hwan as Detective Cha Chul-soo 
Park Bo-gum as young Chul-soo
Sung Yu-ri as Fashion designer Ko Young-jae 
Kim Young-kwang as Han Seung-woo
Lee Soo-hyuk as Top model Kim Sun-ho
Lee Hee-joon as Kyung-Seok
Shin Min-chul as Min-seung
Seo Jiayu as herself
Seo Jini as herself

References

External links

 

2012 action comedy films
South Korean action comedy films
2010s police comedy films
Films shot in Daejeon
Films directed by Shin Tae-ra
2012 comedy films
2010s Korean-language films
2010s South Korean films